Byla is an American ambient duo, formed in Brooklyn, NY in 2003 by Colin Marston (Behold... The Arctopus, Dysrhythmia, et al.) and Kevin Hufnagel (Dysrhythmia). They released their eponymous debut album in 2005.

Byla creates predominantly instrumental music, although in 2007, they released an album as a collaboration with diverse vocalist Jarboe (Swans). They also recorded an instrumental remix track—over 18 minutes in length—based on source material composed by isolationist musician Fear Falls Burning, which was released on a 5-disc LP album along with other remixes by artists such as Bass Communion and Final.

Studio albums
Byla (2005)
Viscera (2007) (collaboration with Jarboe)

Appears on
Fear Falls Burning - Once We All Walk Through Solid Objects (2007)
Jarboe - The Cut Of The Warrior (2018)

External links
Official MySpace page
Byla at the Encyclopaedia Metallum.

American experimental musical groups
American ambient music groups
Musical groups established in 2004
Musical groups from Brooklyn